Mosia is a South African-Ghanaian entrepreneur and co-founder of the Sierra Leone-based solar energy company Easy Solar.

Early life and education 
Mosia was born in Ghana, later moving to South Africa. As a teenager she occasionally experienced blackouts due to unreliable supply of electricity, which first sparked her interest in energy. Mosia gained a Bachelor of Business Science in Finance and Economics from the University of Cape Town, graduating with first class honors and distinction, subsequently working as a management consultant across Africa. In 2016 she studied for a Master's degree focused on Clean Energy Finance and Policy at the School of International and Public Affairs, Columbia University, where she met her co-founders of Easy Solar, Eric Silverman and Alexandre Tourre.

Career 
Mosia and her co-founders conceived of the idea for providing reliable and affordable electricity to households underserved by the grid in West Africa, during their graduate studies. Together they won major funding for the project from competitions and hackathons in the US, such as the D-Prize in 2015 and the Columbia Venture Competition 2016. Initial funding allowed Mosia and her colleagues to conduct a survey of energy availability across 1,500 Sierra Leonean households.

Easy Solar, trading internationally as Azimuth, was created in 2016 as a commercial initiative to extend the reach of high-quality solar energy devices (such as lanterns and home systems) across under-provided Sierra Leone. The company offers financial initiatives, such as rent-to-own, on a pay-as-you-go basis to help poorer households afford their own solar panels.

Studies indicate that as few as one in a hundred rural households in Sierra Leone have access to electricity. Since the company was established Easy Solar claims to have provided 30,000 households with electricity. The company plans to expand the business soon into neighbouring Liberia and Guinea.

Mosia is also an advocate for expanding opportunities for African women.

Recognition 
2020: Forbes Woman Africa Gen Y Award.
2019: Social Entrepreneur of the Year by the World Economic Forum and Schwab Foundation
2019: Forbes Africa 30 Under 30 (Tech Category)
2018: 30 Most Promising Young Entrepreneurs in Africa 2018 by Forbes
2018: 30 Africa Pioneers by Quartz
2017: 100 Most Influential Young People in South Africa by Avance media.
2017: 200 Young South Africans by Mail & Guardian.

References 

Living people
21st-century South African businesswomen
21st-century South African businesspeople
Year of birth missing (living people)